Cannonsburg is a census-designated place (CDP) in Boyd County, Kentucky, United States. As of the 2010 census, it had a population of 856. Most of Cannonsburg shares its ZIP code with Ashland; however, parts are within the Catlettsburg ZIP code. The Cannonsburg post office closed in 1929. Cannonsburg is a part of the Huntington-Ashland Metropolitan Statistical Area (MSA). As of the 2010 census, the MSA had a population of 287,702. New definitions from February 28, 2013 placed the population at 363,000.

Geography

Demographics

Education
Boyd County High School and Cannonsburg Elementary School are located in Cannonsburg. Both are a part of the Boyd County Public School District.

Health
Cannonsburg is served by Bellefonte Primary & Urgent Care (12470 U.S. Route 60). Formerly Bellefonte Primary Care, the facility added urgent care services in 2009.

Transportation
Cannonsburg acts as one of three access points for Interstate 64 (Kentucky), connecting the Ashland area to Lexington, Kentucky, and Huntington, West Virginia, via U.S. Route 60 and Kentucky Route 180. Ashland's other access points are through Catlettsburg via U.S. Route 23 (Kentucky), and Coalton via a two-lane section of US 60.

Improvements
Interstate 64's Exit 185 was completed at KY 180 in 1965. KY 180 was replaced with a new four-lane section from its junction with US 60 to just north of I-64 in 1977. KY 180 formerly curved to the right just north of the intersection with I-64, then followed what is now KY 3291 past Boyd County High School to Cannonsburg Road, where it merged onto that road until its terminus at US 60 near Walmart.

Broadcasting
WONS AM 1080's (Formally WOKT & WYHY) transmitter and tower is located on Lester Lane & East Johnson Road. It has been in operation since 1987 and is currently a Christian Talk formatted radio station. The station is owned by Fowler Media and studios are located in South Point, Ohio.

The construction of a new diamond-shaped interchange at the Interstate 64/KY 180 Exit 185 was completed in fall of 2008 to improve safety and address traffic problems. It was the site of up to one accident per week before improvements were made. Previously KY 180 was two lanes south of the interchange and four lanes north of it, with one southbound lane turning into the I-64 West merging ramp, with a separate turning lane at the Flying J truck stop just to the south. The southern areas are now 3-lane.

Points of interest
The Kyova Mall (formerly Cedar Knoll Galleria) is located in Cannonsburg. In May 2007, Phoenix Theaters opened a ten-screen stadium seating theater in hopes of reviving the mall. The theater presently draws significantly more business than its nearest competitor in downtown Ashland. Following the theater's opening, several new restaurants opened at the mall.  A Wal-Mart Supercenter opened in Cannonsburg on October 13, 1998.

References

External links
Ashland Alliance, regional chamber of commerce
History of Cannonsburg

Census-designated places in Boyd County, Kentucky
Census-designated places in Kentucky